Esplanadi, colloquially known as Espa, is an esplanade and urban park in downtown Helsinki, Finland, situated between the Erottaja square and the Market Square. It is bordered on its northern and southern sides by the Pohjoisesplanadi (Norra Esplanaden, North Esplanadi) and Eteläesplanadi (Södra Esplanaden, South Esplanadi) streets, respectively. Aleksanterinkatu runs parallel to Esplanadi. Esplanadi is well known as a popular walking area, and street performances are also often held in the park.

Designed by the architect Carl Ludwig Engel, the park was originally opened in 1818. In 1827, Engels Teater (the predecessor of the Swedish Theatre), the first theatre building in Helsinki, also designed by Engel, was erected in a corner of the park. Centered in the park is a statue of Johan Ludvig Runeberg, the national poet of Finland, by his son Walter Runeberg. Other public art pieces include works by Viktor Jansson, Gunnar Finne and Lauri Leppänen.

The eastern end of the park houses the Kappeli restaurant, which opened in 1867. In front of the restaurant is an outdoor stage, which hosts numerous live music performances. Other prestigious restaurants on the edge of the park include Restaurant Olo on Pohjoisesplanadi and Savoy Restaurant on Eteläesplanadi.

Gallery

See also
 Central Park (Helsinki)
 Kolmikulma

References

External links

 Esplanade Park in Green Hearts – Park Walks In Helsinki by City of Helsinki Public Works Department

Parks in Helsinki
Squares in Helsinki
Streets in Helsinki
Kaartinkaupunki